Erythrocercus is a genus of birds containing three flycatchers that are found in Africa.

The genus is placed in its own family Erythrocercidae that was introduced by Silke Fregin and collaborators in 2012.

Species
The genus contains the following species:

References

External links
 
 

 
Monarchidae
Bird genera
Taxonomy articles created by Polbot